The 2020–21 Coupe de France preliminary rounds, overseas departments and territories, made up the qualifying competition to decide which teams from the French Overseas Departments and Territories took part in the main competition from the seventh round. 

The six (or more, if required) preliminary rounds were organised by the 6 Regional leagues of the overseas departments and territories. They took place between February and October 2020.

In 2019–20 JS Saint-Pierroise from Réunion survived longest in the competition, beating Ligue 2 Niort in the ninth round, before eventually losing to Épinal in the round of 32, equalling the record for an overseas team's progression in the competition.

Mayotte 
Originally, a total of 60 teams from Régionale 1, Régional 2, Régionale 3 and Régionale 4 divisions were registered for the qualifying tournament. The original structure of the tournament required a preliminary round with four ties between Régionale 4 teams; Régionale 2 and Régionale 3 teams entering at the first round stage and Régionale 1 teams entering at the second round stage. The draw for the preliminary round was made on 13 February 2020. Note that the Mayotte League continue to refer to the preliminary round as the first round, and the naming convention used here is to bring the rounds in line with other regions and territories.

Preliminary round (Mayotte)
These matches were played on 23 February 2020.

Note: Mayotte League structure (no promotion to French League structure):
 Régionale 1 (R1)
 Régionale 2 (R2)
 Régionale 3 (R3)
 Régionale 4 (R4)

Suspension of the competition due to COVID-19
Only the preliminary round was played before the suspension of all competition due to the COVID-19 pandemic in Mayotte. On 6 July 2020, due to the state of health emergency being extended until the end of October, and the lack of any date for competition to commence, the Mayotte League were contacted by the FFF regarding how the qualifying teams would be selected. The league elected to consult with its clubs.

Reconfiguration and restart
On 27 September 2020, the Comité de Direction announced a planned restart of the competition, with 64 teams remaining, including the four qualified from the first round. The second round draw was scheduled for 9 October 2020 with matches taking place on 24 October 2020.

On 9 October, the Commission Régionale Sportive et des Terrains published the draw for the first and second rounds. The first round features the teams from divisions lower than Régional 1, including those victorious in the original preliminary round, participating in 25 ties with two teams given byes to the second round. The second round includes the teams from Régional 1, with 7 ties and 25 teams given byes to the third round. The draw for the third and fourth rounds was made on 27 October 2020. The draw for the fifth round was made on 3 November 2020. The draw for the sixth round was made on 9 November 2020.

First round (Mayotte)
These matches were played on 17 and 18 October 2020.

Note: Mayotte League structure (no promotion to French League structure):
 Régionale 1 (R1)
 Régionale 2 (R2)
 Régionale 3 (R3)
 Régionale 4 (R4)

Second round (Mayotte)
These matches were played on 24 and 25 October 2020.

Note: Mayotte League structure (no promotion to French League structure):
 Régionale 1 (R1)
 Régionale 2 (R2)
 Régionale 3 (R3)
 Régionale 4 (R4)

Third round (Mayotte)
These matches were played on 31 October 2020.

Note: Mayotte League structure (no promotion to French League structure):
 Régionale 1 (R1)
 Régionale 2 (R2)
 Régionale 3 (R3)
 Régionale 4 (R4)

Fourth round (Mayotte)
These matches were played on 7 November 2020.

Note: Mayotte League structure (no promotion to French League structure):
 Régionale 1 (R1)
 Régionale 2 (R2)
 Régionale 3 (R3)
 Régionale 4 (R4)

Fifth round (Mayotte)
These matches were played on 11 November 2020.

Note: Mayotte League structure (no promotion to French League structure):
 Régionale 1 (R1)
 Régionale 2 (R2)
 Régionale 3 (R3)
 Régionale 4 (R4)

Sixth round (Mayotte)
These matches were played on 15 November 2020.

Note: Mayotte League structure (no promotion to French League structure):
 Régionale 1 (R1)
 Régionale 2 (R2)
 Régionale 3 (R3)
 Régionale 4 (R4)

Réunion 
Due to the COVID-19 pandemic in Réunion, the normal qualifying competition could not take place. In June 2020 the Ligue Réunionnaise de Football announced that a smaller qualifying competition, restricted to 16 teams, would take place over three rounds, with the teams involved being the 14 from Régional 1 and the 2 relegated to Régional 2 at the end of last season. On 27 July, due to the ongoing pandemic situation, the start date of qualifying was moved to 2 September 2020. The draw for the first set of fixtures, analogous to the fourth round of qualifying, was finally made on 16 October 2020, with matches to take place over the weekend of 31 October and 1 November 2020.

Fourth round (Réunion)
These matches were played on 31 October and 1 November 2020 

Note: Reúnion League structure (no promotion to French League structure):
 Régionale 1 (R1)
 Régionale 2 (R2)

Fifth round (Réunion)
These matches were played on 7 and 8 November 2020 

Note: Reúnion League structure (no promotion to French League structure):
 Régionale 1 (R1)
 Régionale 2 (R2)

Sixth round (Réunion)
These matches were played on 14 and 15 November 2020 

Note: Reúnion League structure (no promotion to French League structure):
 Régionale 1 (R1)
 Régionale 2 (R2)

French Guiana
On 13 July 2020, the Ligue Football Guyane proposed an alternative calendar due to the ongoing COVID situation. This proposal would see the competition start with the third round on 31 October 2020.

The draw was made for the third round on 28 August 2020, and was published on 7 September 2020. A total of 32 teams entered the competition, and all entered at this third round stage. The draw for the fourth round was made on 1 November 2020. The draw for the fifth round was made on 8 November 2020.

Third round (French Guiana) 
These matches were played between 24 and 31 October 2020.

Note: French Guiana League structure (no promotion to French League structure):
 Régional 1 (R1)
 Régional 2 (R2)

Fourth round (French Guiana) 
These matches were played on 6, 7 and 8 November 2020.

Note: French Guiana League structure (no promotion to French League structure):
 Régional 1 (R1)
 Régional 2 (R2)

Fifth round (French Guiana) 
These matches were played on 14 November 2020.

Note: French Guiana League structure (no promotion to French League structure):
 Régional 1 (R1)
 Régional 2 (R2)

Sixth round (French Guiana) 
These matches were played on 21 November 2020.

Note: French Guiana League structure (no promotion to French League structure):
 Régional 1 (R1)
 Régional 2 (R2)

Martinique
A total of 52 teams from the three Régionale divisions entered the competition. Ten teams (seven from Régionale 1 and three from Régionale 2) were awarded a bye in the opening round, leaving 22 ties involving 44 teams.

Second round (Martinique)
This season, the preliminary rounds start with the second round, due to the number of clubs entered. These matches were played on 21, 22, 26 and 29 August 2020.

Note: Martinique League structure (no promotion to French League structure):
 Régionale 1 (R1)
 Régionale 2 (R2)
 Régionale 3 (R3)

Third round (Martinique)
These matches were played on 28 and 29 August and 1 and 9 September 2020.

Note: Martinique League structure (no promotion to French League structure):
 Régionale 1 (R1)
 Régionale 2 (R2)
 Régionale 3 (R3)

Fourth round (Martinique)
These matches were played on 11 and 12 September 2020.

Note: Martinique League structure (no promotion to French League structure):
 Régionale 1 (R1)
 Régionale 2 (R2)
 Régionale 3 (R3)

Fifth round (Martinique)
These matches were played on 13 and 14 October 2020.

Note: Martinique League structure (no promotion to French League structure):
 Régionale 1 (R1)
 Régionale 2 (R2)
 Régionale 3 (R3)

Sixth round (Martinique)
These matches were played on 24 October 2020.

Note: Martinique League structure (no promotion to French League structure):
 Régionale 1 (R1)
 Régionale 2 (R2)
 Régionale 3 (R3)

Guadeloupe
The draw for the opening round was made on 21 August 2020, with a total of 48 clubs participating. To align with the other qualifying competitions, this competition starts at the second round. Sixteen clubs from the Régional 1 division were exempted to the third round.

Second round (Guadeloupe)
This season, the preliminary rounds start with the second round, due to the number of clubs entering.
These matches were played between 21 August and 9 September 2020.

Note: Guadeloupe League structure (no promotion to French League structure):

 Ligue Régionale 1 (R1)
 Ligue Régionale 2 (R2)
 Ligue Régionale 3 (R3)

Third round (Guadeloupe)
These matches were played between 9 and 13 September 2020.

Note: Guadeloupe League structure (no promotion to French League structure):
 Ligue Régionale 1 (R1)
 Ligue Régionale 2 (R2)
 Ligue Régionale 3 (R3)

Fourth round (Guadeloupe)
These matches were played on 2 and 3 October 2020.

Note: Guadeloupe League structure (no promotion to French League structure):
 Ligue Régionale 1 (R1)
 Ligue Régionale 2 (R2)
 Ligue Régionale 3 (R3)

Fifth round (Guadeloupe)
These matches were played on 13 and 14 October 2020.

Note: Guadeloupe League structure (no promotion to French League structure):
 Ligue Régionale 1 (R1)
 Ligue Régionale 2 (R2)
 Ligue Régionale 3 (R3)

Sixth round (Guadeloupe)
These matches were played on 27 and 28 October 2020.

Note: Guadeloupe League structure (no promotion to French League structure):
 Ligue Régionale 1 (R1)
 Ligue Régionale 2 (R2)
 Ligue Régionale 3 (R3)

Saint Pierre and Miquelon
The Overseas Collectivity of Saint Pierre and Miquelon has only three teams, so there was just one match in each of two rounds, with one team receiving a bye to the second round. The winner gains entry to the third round draw of the Pays de la Loire region.

On 8 September 2020, the prefecture of Saint-Pierre-et-Miquelon banned the travel of A.S. Saint Pierraise to mainland France due to the ongoing COVID-19 situation. The side had been due to depart on 12 September, travelling via Montreal and Paris.

First round (Saint Pierre and Miquelon)
The match was played on 18 July 2020.

Second round (Saint Pierre and Miquelon)
The match was played on 25 July 2020.

References

2020–21 Coupe de France